Space Cadet Solo Flight is the seventh studio album by the funk and disco group KC and the Sunshine Band. The album was produced by Harry Wayne Casey and Richard Finch and was released in 1981 on the TK label.

History
Space Cadet Solo Flight was credited only to group lead vocalist KC. Featuring more of a pop sound than the previous albums, it was not successful as the album and none of the singles released charted in the US. The album is notable for including a cover of the Supremes' 1966 hit song "You Keep Me Hangin' On".

Track listing

Personnel
Harry Wayne Casey – keyboards, vocal
Richard Finch – bass guitar, drum, percussion
Larry Dermer – keyboards
Paul Harris – keyboards
Ernest Stewart – keyboards
Timmy Thomas – keyboards
Slick Aguilar – guitar
Tony Battaglia – guitar
Mark Gabriele – guitar
Tommy Johnson – guitar
Ishmael Ledesma – guitar
Emmanuel Taylor – bass
Joe Galdo – drum
Robert Johnson – drum
Omar Martinez – drum
Mark Novotak – drum
Fermin Goytisolo – percussion
Ken Faulk – trumpet
Brett Murphey – trumpet
Jerry Peel – French horn
Mike Lewis – tenor saxophone
Whit Sidener – baritone saxophone
Deborah Carter – background vocals
Beverly Champion – background vocals
Denise King – background vocals

References

External links
 Space Cadet Solo Flight at Discogs

KC and the Sunshine Band albums
1981 albums
TK Records albums